The SCR-658 radar is a radio direction finding set  introduced by the U. S. Army in 1944, was developed in conjunction with the SCR-268 radar. It was preceded by the SCR-258. Its primary purpose was to track weather balloons. Prior to this it was only possible to track weather balloons with a theodolite, causing difficulty with visual tracking in poor weather conditions. The set is small enough to be portable and carried in a Ben Hur trailer.

Surviving examples
There is one known survivor at the Air Force museum in Dayton Ohio.

See also
 Signal Corps Radio
 Radiosonde

Notes

References
 TM 11-1158
 TM 11-2409 mobile Meteorological station
 Air Defense Artillery Journal March–April 1949

External links
 http://www.photolib.noaa.gov/htmls/wea01200.htm
 https://web.archive.org/web/20100413132056/http://www.gordon.army.mil/ocos/museum/equipment.asp SCR and BC lists
 https://web.archive.org/web/20081121225613/http://6thweathermobile.org/1949_(part%201).htm excellent pics.
 http://www.srh.noaa.gov/ssd/tstm/html/tstorm.htm

Meteorological instrumentation and equipment
Weather radars
Military radars of the United States
World War II radars
World War II American electronics
Military equipment introduced from 1940 to 1944
de:Radiosonde
es:Radiosonda
nl:Radiosonde
ja:ラジオゾンデ
no:Radiosonde
nn:Radiosonde
pl:Radiosonda
pt:Radiossonda
fi:Radioluotaus
sv:Radiosond
zh:无线电探空仪